The Masonic Temple Building in Viroqua, Wisconsin was built in the Classical Revival style.  It was designed by architects Albert E. Parkinson and Bernard Dockendorff and was listed on the National Register of Historic Places in 2000.

It is a two-story  building.  

After the former Masonic Temple was destroyed by fire in 1920, the current structure was built to house the Masonic Temple on the second floor, and the middle part of the first level built to house the Temple Theatre. Construction on the building began in September 1921 and was completed in January 1922.

A dedication ceremony was held on August 24, 1922.

References

Clubhouses on the National Register of Historic Places in Wisconsin
Neoclassical architecture in Wisconsin
Masonic buildings completed in 1921
Buildings and structures in Vernon County, Wisconsin
Masonic buildings in Wisconsin
National Register of Historic Places in Vernon County, Wisconsin